The 1968–69 Danish 1. division season was the 12th season of ice hockey in Denmark. Eight teams participated in the league, and Esbjerg IK won the championship. AaB Ishockey was relegated.

Regular season

External links
Season on eliteprospects.com

Danish
1968 in Danish sport
1969 in Danish sport